The National Centre for Women Development (NCWD) is a Nigerian state-owned enterprise based in Abuja. It was established in 1997.

History
The NWCD was commissioned on 17 October 1997, and modelled on the United Nations International Research and Training Institute for the Advancement of Women (INSTRAW). It works in collaboration with Nigeria's Federal Ministry of Women Affairs and Social Development. Between 1997 and 2003 the NCWD published a magazine, Images of the Nigerian Woman.

In 2013 President Goodluck Jonathan appointed Onyeka Onwenu as Executive Director/Chief Executive Officer of the NCWD. Onwenu served for two and a half years, claiming to have raised morale under difficult conditions in which she faced some ethnic opposition. In February 2016 President Muhammadu Buhari removed Onwenu, appointing Abdulmalik Dauda to succeed her as Acting Director General. Onwenu criticised Dauda for reversing some staffing changes. Dauda died in April 2016. In 2017 Mary Ekpere-Eta was appointed Director General of NCWD.

Hall of Fame
The NWCD celebrates the achievement of prominent Nigerian women with a Hall of Fame. Names of notable Nigerian women are etched in marble on the wall. The wall includes First Ladies of Nigeria such as Aisha Muhammadu Buhari, Maryam Babangida, Stella Obasanjo and Patience Jonathan, and other prominent women such as Dr Elizabeth Awoliyi, Senator Franca Afegbua, Dr (Mrs) Dora Akunyili, Dr (Mrs) Ngozi Okonjo-Iweala, Mrs Doyin Abiola, Prof Grace Alele Williams and Mrs Sarah Jibrin. In 2007, 27 women were inducted into the Hall of Fame. In June 2019, 22 more women were inducted:
 Alhaja Kudirat Abiola
 Stella Ameyo Adadevoh
 Hajiya Bilkisu Yusuf
 Alhaja Abibat Mogaji
 Barr Oby Nwankwo
 Regina Achi Nentui
 Iyom Josephine Anenih
 Oluremi Tinubu
 Binta Garba
 Hajiya Mariya Sunusi Dantata
 Stella Okoli
 Adenike Osofisan
 Priscilla Ekwueme Eleje
 Adebimpe Bologun
 Iyalode Alaba Lawson
 Folorunsho Alakija
 Nike Okundaye
 Mo Abudu
 Itunu Hotonu
 Blessing Liman
 Abimbola Jaiyeola
 Maureen Mmadu

References

1997 establishments in Nigeria
Research institutes established in 1997
Women's organizations based in Nigeria
Government-owned companies of Nigeria